The 1988 New Hampshire Wildcats football team was an American football team that represented the University of New Hampshire as a member of the Yankee Conference during the 1988 NCAA Division I-AA football season. In its 17th year under head coach Bill Bowes, the team compiled a 6–5 record (4–4 against conference opponents) and tied for third place out of eight teams in the Yankee Conference.

Schedule

References

New Hampshire
New Hampshire Wildcats football seasons
New Hampshire Wildcats football